This is a list of ports of the United States, ranked by tonnage. See the articles on individual ports for more information, including geography, ownership, and link to official website.

Top 50 U.S. Ports by Tonnage

Not ranked
 Alpena, Michigan
 Aransas Pass, Texas
 Biloxi, Mississippi
 Bridgeport, Connecticut
 Buffalo, New York
 Buffington, Indiana
 Cape May, New Jersey
 Chattanooga, Tennessee
 Port of CatoosaTulsa Ports, Tulsa,Oklahoma
 Port of Chester, Pennsylvania
 Port of Davisville, Rhode Island
 Drummond Island, Michigan
 Elvis Stahr Harbor, Kentucky
 Exxon Terminal, East Providence, Rhode Island
 Eureka, California
 Everett, Washington
 Fairport Harbor, Ohio
 Fall River, Massachusetts
 Grand Haven, Michigan
 Grays Harbor, Washington
 Green Bay, Wisconsin
 Gulfport, Mississippi
 Guntersville, Alabama
 Helena, Arkansas
 Town of Hempstead, New York
 Hilo, Hawaii
 Hopewell, Virginia
 Iliuliuk Harbor, Alaska
 Intracoastal City, Louisiana
 Joliet, Illinois
 Juneau, Alaska
 Kawaihae, Hawai'i
 Ketchikan, Alaska
 Kivilina, Alaska
 Lake Providence, Louisiana
 Louisiana Offshore Oil Port
 Marquette, Michigan
 Monroe, Michigan
 Morgan City, Louisiana, Port of
 Muskegon, Michigan
 Natchez, Mississippi
 Nawiliwili, Hawaii
 New London, Connecticut
 Nome, Alaska
 Olympia, Washington
 Orange, Texas
 Panama City, Florida
 Peoria, Illinois
 Penn Manor, Pennsylvania
 Pensacola, Florida
 Port Angeles, Washington
 Port Jefferson, New York
 Port of Coos Bay, Oregon
 Port of Decatur, Alabama
 Port of Hueneme, California
 Port of Kansas City, Missouri
 Port of New Bedford, Massachusetts
 Port of Palm Beach, Florida
 Port of Ponce, Puerto Rico
 Port of Redwood City, California
 Port of Salem, New Jersey
 Port of San Diego, California
 Port of San Francisco, California
 Port of St. Petersburg, Florida
 Prudhoe Bay, Alaska
 Rockford, Illinois 
 Rosedale, Mississippi
 Sacramento, California
 Salem Harbor, Massachusetts
 Salisbury, Maryland
 Sault Ste Marie, Michigan
 Searsport, Maine
 Seward, Alaska
 Southeast Missouri Port, Missouri
 Tucson, Arizona
 Unalaska Island, Alaska
 Utqiaġvik, Alaska
 Vallejo, California
 Vicksburg, Mississippi

Non-continental islands

See also
List of ports and harbours of the Atlantic Ocean
List of ports and harbors of the Pacific Ocean
List of ports and harbors of the Arctic Ocean
Inland port#North America
United States ports
Louisiana International Gulf Transfer Terminal
United States container ports

References

General References

United States of America